The Fermeuse Formation is a fossil-bearing Ediacaran geologic formation in Newfoundland.

Palaeobiological community 

On Avalon Peninsula there is low diversity, and includes rare trace fossils, Palaeopascichnus, and Aspidella discs, sometimes in great concentrations.

On Bonavista Peninsula there is higher diversity, including more fronds (rangeomorphs) and better preserved than on Avalon Peninsula.

Depositional environment 
On Bonavista Peninsula the depositional environment was a slope and outer shelf–below photic zone Turbidites probably were the dominant sediment transporters.

It is predominantly silts and sands, in contrast to underlying Trepassey Formation, which is mostly dark grey shales. There is a coarsening up sequence throughout the two formations, such that the top of the Fermeuse is predominantly sandstones.

On Avalon Peninsula there were much shallower waters, particularly than in underlying Mistaken Point Formation and Trepassey Formation.   It is indicated by sandy channel fills, slumping, occasional silts.  There is a possible delta front and shallow slope setting.

See also

 List of fossiliferous stratigraphic units in Newfoundland and Labrador

References

 

Ediacaran Newfoundland and Labrador